Village United Football Club is a Jamaican football team playing at the 2nd level of the football pyramid in Jamaica which is regional placing the club in the Western Confederation. The other regional areas are Eastern Confederation, South Central Confederation and Kingston and St. Andrew Confederation(KASFA).

The club is based in Falmouth and their current home stadium is the Elleston Wakeland Stadium in Falmouth, which can hold a capacity of 3,000. The club moved from Falmouth's Elleston Wakeland Stadium in the 2010–2011 season to the Trelawny Multi Purpose Stadium that had a capacity of 25,00 but were back there after relegation in the 2011–2012 season.

The team has never won the National Premier League.

History
Village United F.C was formed on September 8, 1968 in an area of Falmouth called Village or Compound. The area is located opposite the Elleston Wakeland Stadium.

Achievements
A-league champions 2001–2003

References

External links
Team profile – Golocaljamaica
Village Photos – Village United FC PHOTOS
Village United – Official team website

Football clubs in Jamaica
Association football clubs established in 1968
1968 establishments in Jamaica